The George A. Sidelinger House is a historic house at 19 Avon Way in Quincy, Massachusetts.  The -story wood-frame house was built c. 1904 by George Sidelinger, a local politician.  It is one of a small number of well-preserved Shingle style houses on President's Hill.  Its three-bay gabled facade has a diamond paned window in a curved recess near the gable peak, and a small Palladian window below.  Its porch wraps around to the side, and is supported by clusters of Doric columns, set on piers with a low balustrade between.

The house was listed on the National Register of Historic Places in 1989.

See also
National Register of Historic Places listings in Quincy, Massachusetts

References

Houses in Quincy, Massachusetts
Queen Anne architecture in Massachusetts
Houses completed in 1904
Shingle Style houses
National Register of Historic Places in Quincy, Massachusetts
Houses on the National Register of Historic Places in Norfolk County, Massachusetts
Shingle Style architecture in Massachusetts